Anodonta californiensis, the California floater, is a species of freshwater mussel, an aquatic bivalve mollusk in the family Unionidae, the river mussels.

Description
They are very similar to A. nuttalliana, and recent studies believe the two may actually be part of the same clade. The two were thought to be distinguishable by the prominent dorsel wing which was lacking in the California floater.

Distribution
The range of the California floater may include Idaho, California, Utah, Washington, Arizona, Wyoming, Nevada, and Mexico. The exact range is unclear and may overlap with A. nuttalliana.

References

californiensis
Bivalves described in 1852